Salvador Oliva i Llinàs (1942-12-06, Banyoles, Pla de l'Estany) is a translator, poet, and retired university professor. He received a licentiate in romance philology and a doctorate in Catalan philology from the University of Barcelona. He was a professor at the University of Girona for forty years until, in 2013, he retired as the Chair of Catalan Philology.

In addition to the complete dramatic and poetic work of William Shakespeare, which he began when creating subtitles for BBC broadcasts, he has translated into Catalan work by W. H. Auden, Dylan Thomas, Oscar Wilde, R. L. Stevenson, Washington Irving and Jean-Claude Grumberg and Lewis Carroll's Alice in Wonderland.

Publications

Essays and books 
 Mètrica catalana (1981)
 Introducció a la mètrica (1986, reprinted in 2008 with the title Nova introducció a la mètrica)
 La mètrica i el ritme de la prosa (1992)
 Introducció a Shakespeare (2001)
 Tractat d'elocució (2006)
 Poesia i veritat (2015)
 La rehumanización del arte (2015)
 Epístoles a Josep Carner (2018)

Poetry 
 Marees del desig (1975)
 Terres perdudes (1981)
 El somriure del tigre (1986)
 Retalls de sastre (1988)
 Fugitius (1994)
 Complements circumstancials (1998)

References

External links
 Articles about Salvador Oliva in the newspaper El País
 his personal web page.

Catalan-language poets
Translators of William Shakespeare
Living people
Academic staff of the University of Girona

1942 births